Undercurrent is an album by American pianist Kenny Drew that was recorded in 1960 and released by Blue Note in 1961. It was Drew's last album for the label and his last album recorded in the U.S. before moving to Copenhagen, Denmark, in 1961.

Reception 
The Allmusic review by Michael G. Nastos gave the album 4½ stars and stated, "This is an extraordinary recording that reveals more upon repeat listenings".

Track listing

Personnel 
 Kenny Drew – piano
 Freddie Hubbard – trumpet
 Hank Mobley – tenor saxophone
 Sam Jones – double bass
 Louis Hayes – drums

References 

Blue Note Records albums
Kenny Drew albums
1961 albums
Albums produced by Alfred Lion
Albums recorded at Van Gelder Studio